Rosary High School may refer to:

Rosary High School (Fullerton, California), renamed 2015 as Rosary Academy
Rosary High School (Aurora, Illinois)
Rosary High School (Vadodara), India